Daisuke Daimon was a male international table tennis player from Japan.

Table tennis career
He won a bronze medal at the 1952 World Table Tennis Championships in the Swaythling Cup (men's team event) when representing Japan. The team consisted of Norikazu Fujii, Tadaaki Hayashi and Hiroji Satoh. He was the non-playing captain of the team. He was the Secretary-Coach of the Japanese teams.

See also
 List of table tennis players
 List of World Table Tennis Championships medalists

References

Japanese male table tennis players
World Table Tennis Championships medalists